Diplodon pfeifferi is a species of bivalve in the family Hyriidae. It is endemic to Brazil.

References

Fauna of Brazil
Hyriidae
Endemic fauna of Brazil
Bivalves described in 1819
Taxonomy articles created by Polbot